The 2006 FIFA World Cup qualification CAF Group 3 was a CAF qualifying group for the 2006 FIFA World Cup. The group comprised Benin, Cameroon, Ivory Coast, Egypt, Libya, and Sudan.

The group was won by Ivory Coast, who qualified for the 2006 FIFA World Cup. Ivory Coast, Cameroon, and Libya qualified for the 2006 Africa Cup of Nations. Egypt automatically qualified for the Africa Cup of Nations as a host nation.

Second round

Standings

Results

3